Elemér Kocsis (26 February 1910 – 6 October 1981, in Romania) was a Hungarian Romanian football forward and coach.

Career 
During his career he has made twelve appearances and five goal for the Romania national team.
His career in club football was spent at CS Salonta between 1924 and 1928, at CA Oradea in 1928-1937 and at FC Ploieşti in 1948.

Honours

Player
FC Ploieşti
Liga II (3): 1937–38, 1939–40, 1946–47

References

External links 

People from Salonta
Romanian footballers
Romania international footballers
Romanian sportspeople of Hungarian descent
1930 FIFA World Cup players
1910 births
1981 deaths
Liga I players
Liga II players
CA Oradea players
FC Ploiești players
Romanian football managers
CA Oradea managers
Association football forwards